Dartmouth received borough status in 1341 with the right to elect a mayor.  In 1974 the town became part of  South Hams District. There is still a Town Council and a mayor, but with reduced powers.

The following have been mayors of Dartmouth, Devon, England:

14th century
1374–75: John Hawley, MP for Dartmouth, 1390, 1393, 1394 and 1402 
1376–77: John Hawley
1378–79: John Hawley
1382–83: John Hawley
1385–86: John Hawley
1387–89: John Hawley
1390–91: John Hawley
1392–95: John Hawley
1397–99: John Hawley
1400–01: John Hawley

16th Century
1547-48: Nicholas Roupe, MP for Dartmouth  1553
1551-52: Gilbert Roupe, MP for Dartmouth 1553
1554=55: Nicholas Roupe, MP for Dartmouth 1553
1593: Nicholas Hayman, MP for Dartmouth 1586 and 1593
1597–98: Thomas Holland, MP for Dartmouth, 1593, 1604 and 1614

17th century
1602: Nicholas Hayman
c.1620: Andrew Voysey, MP for Dartmouth, 1640

[William Plumleigh] Recvr. Dartmouth 1610–11,2 mayor 1617–18, 1625–6, 1632–3, 1641-2

20th century

1900-01 Thomas Wilton
1901-02 William Philip Ditcham
1902-03 John William Medway (Liberal)
1903-06 Richard Burford Seale
1906-10 John Brown
1910-11 Edward Ethelbert Lort Phillips
1911-14 Charles Peek
1914-18 Thomas Wilton
1918-19 Sir Thomas Wilton
1919-21 Charles Peek
1921-22 Algernon Joseph Yorke
1922-23 Sir Alfred G. Bourne
1923-29 Dr Henry J. Campbell
1929-32 James Harry Smith
1932-33 George Henry Marshall
1933-36 Ernest Albert Travers
1936-37 William Thomas Pillar
1937-38 George Henry Marshall
1938-45 William George Row
1945-46 Herbert George Middleton
1946-47 Frank Scardifield
1947-50 Bertie Lavers
1950-51 James Clifford S.R. Stoneman
1951-53 Albert Montague William Chapman
1953-54 Harold John Adams
1954-56 Dorothy Holwill, 1st woman mayor
1956-57 Bertie Lavers
1957-58 Norman Hewson
1958-60 Harold Charles Lloyd
1960-61 James William Lee Palin
1961-62 Richard Martin Hoare
1962-63 Dorothy Holwill
1963-65 Eric S. Rimmer
1965-66 Margaret V.M. Keane
1966-67 Harold G. White
1967-68 Robert Middleton
1968-69 Eric J. Cook
1969-70 Albert J. Mashford
1970-71 Eric J. Cook
1971-73 Frank C. Mullett
1973-74Irene Ethel Frances Scawn 
1974-75 Albert J. Mashford
1975-76 Brenda Bradley Breakwell
1976-77 Brian Alfred Goss
1977-78 Richard Martin Hoare
1978-80 Dennis Arthur Woods
1980-81 Irene Ethel Frances Scawn
1981-83 Donald William Rablin Webb
1983-85 Beryl Mary Calder
1985-86 Leslie William Savage
1986-89 Donald William Rablin Webb
1989-90 Bryan Martin Measures
1990-93 Brian J. Edgington
1993-95 Jack Cutter
1995-97 Margaret A Roberts
1997-99 Paul J. Darby
1999-2000 Melvyn Stone

21st century
2000–05: Richard Rendle
2005–06: Peter Norton
2006–07: Iris Pritchard
2007–08: Iris Pritchard
2008–09: Debbie Morris 
2010–11: Richard Rendle
2011–13: Paul Allen
2014–15: Rob M Lyon 
2016–17: Rob M Lyon 
2017–18: Richard Cooke 
2018–19: Rob M Lyon

References

External links
 List of Mayors

Dartmouth